was a Japanese video game developer. The company was established in 1982 as a real estate agent, but in 1983 began to develop video games. The company heavily participated in the Disk Original Group, a collective publishing house for Famicom Disk System games headed by Square. Many of HummingBirdSoft's games are either traditional role-playing video games or adventure games, although they also developed a couple of pinball video games. While none of their games were published in North America, some have been unofficially translated by fans.

Games

External links
 RetroPC.NET HummingBirdSoft Page

Video game companies established in 1982
Defunct video game companies of Japan
1982 establishments in Japan